"Sucked Out" is a song by Superdrag and the first single from their debut album, Regretfully Yours. It peaked at #17 on the Billboard Modern Rock Tracks chart.

Reception
Pitchfork described the song as "Tight and tuneful, with a hook that still sounds fresh even after the band has bashed through it at least a dozen times within three minutes, "Sucked Out" provided a rare dose of honest-to-god melody amid the yarling post-grunge that was starting to clog up the alternative airwaves in the mid '90s."

References

1996 debut singles
Elektra Records singles
Music videos directed by Chris Applebaum
1996 songs